Bermuda College is a community college in Paget Parish, Bermuda.

Overview
The only post-secondary educational institution in Bermuda, Bermuda College offers a variety of academic, technical and professional courses in the Divisions of Applied Science & Technology, Business Administration & Hospitality, Liberal Arts, and the Centre for Professional and Career Education. Programmes lead to associate's degrees, certificate or diplomas and professional designation and non-credit offerings for lifelong learners.

The institution also has partnerships with Mount Saint Vincent University in Halifax, Nova Scotia, Georgia State University and Miami University and a number of other colleges, allowing students to earn bachelor's and master's degrees in certain subjects while studying in Bermuda. For  many years, Bermuda College had a similar partnership with Queen's University in Kingston, Ontario.

Bermuda College has approximately 1370 students with an average class size of 15 as of fall 2008. In 2004/2005 the College had 517 applicants of which 467 actually enrolled. This included 287 traditional and 230 non-traditional applicants. There are 52 full-time faculty and 53 adjunct lecturers.

History
The College was created by the Parliament of Bermuda through the passage of the Bermuda College Act in 1974 with the amalgamation of three flourishing institutions: the Bermuda Technical Institute established in 1956, the Bermuda Hotel and Catering College (1965), and the Academic Sixth Form Centre (1967). Dr. Duranda Greene is the College's first female and the youngest president, taking over from Dr. Charles Green in the summer of 2007.

Facilities
The Bermuda College Library maintains more than 35,000 volumes and 1,315 reels of microfilm. In addition, a special collection of Bermudiana consisting of 1,104 volumes and 348 rare books which contain material that is now out of print. The library also provides access to online resources and other informational databases.

Bermuda College has six student computer labs. The college has a Windows NT network that provides access to a wide range of programming languages, software packages, and applications, including the Internet.

See also
Citizens Uprooting Racism in Bermuda (1998)

References

External links
Bermuda College Website

Educational organisations based in Bermuda
Paget Parish
Educational institutions established in 1974
1974 establishments in North America
Universities and colleges in British Overseas Territories